Nu is an interpreted object-oriented programming language, with a Lisp-like syntax, created by Tim Burks as an alternative scripting language to program OS X through its Cocoa application programming interface (API). Implementations also exist for iPhone and Linux.

The language was first announced at C4, a conference for indie Mac developers held in August 2007.

Example code 
This Nu code defines a simple complex numbers class.

(class Complex is NSObject
  (ivar (double) real
        (double) imaginary)

  (- initWithReal:(double) x imaginary:(double) y is
    (super init)
    (set @real x)
    (set @imaginary y)
    self))

The example is a basic definition of a complex number: it defines the instance variables, and a method to initialize the object.  It shows the similarity between the code in Nu and the equivalent in Objective-C; it also shows the similarity with Ruby.

(unless @prefix
        (set @prefix 
             "#{((((NSProcessInfo processInfo) arguments) 0) dirName)}.."))

(unless @icon_files 
        (set @icon_files 
             (array "#{@prefix}/share/nu/resources/nu.icns")))

This sample, from the nuke tool bundled with Nu, also shows the influence of Objective-C, Lisp, and Ruby in the design of the language.

See also 

 F-Script
 MacRuby
 RubyCocoa

References

External links 
 
 

Lisp programming language family
Class-based programming languages
Free compilers and interpreters
Procedural programming languages
Object-oriented programming languages
Programming languages created in 2007